WXJC (850 AM, "The Truth") is a radio station licensed to serve Birmingham, Alabama.  The station is licensed to Kimtron, Inc., and is owned by Crawford Broadcasting Company.  It airs a Southern Gospel music and Talk radio format.

The station has been assigned the WXJC call letters by the Federal Communications Commission since July 15, 2004.

History
The station currently known as WXJC signed on in 1946 as WTNB, broadcasting with 250 watts daytime power and 250 watts at night at 1490 kHz.  It was originally an affiliate of the Mutual Broadcasting System.  The initial call letters reflected the initials of the station's original owner, Thomas N. Beech.  In the 1950s the station was sold to Madison Broadcasting and changed its frequency to 850 and its call sign to WILD, retaining those call letters until the station was sold in September 1957, when Bartell Broadcasters bought the station and changed the call letters to WYDE.  By the late 1950s WYDE was one of three stations in Birmingham playing Top 40 music, along with WSGN and WVOK.

In 1965 WYDE changed formats, dropping Top 40 and becoming a country music station.  Unlike some country music stations, WYDE's presentation was more polished and urbane.  The station's tagline was WYDE (pronounced like "wide") Countrypolitan.  For the remainder of the 1960s and throughout most of the 1970s, the station had no direct competition in the format.  This changed in 1976 when WVOK dropped its longstanding Top 40 programming and switched to country as well.

By 1977 WYDE had a second and perhaps more serious competitor as a country music station, when WZZK became the first FM station in Birmingham to switch to country music.  WYDE retained its format until 1982, when it dropped country to become Birmingham's first station to exclusively play oldies from the 1950s through the early 1970s.  In 1984 the station was sold and became a Christian music and teaching station. Throughout the remainder of the 1980s and 1990s, the station tried several different formats, including beautiful music and news-talk in an attempt to gain listeners.

On November 18, 1996, the station became one of Radio Disney's charter affiliates, as par of the network's test launch before going national the following year. The station later changing it's callsigns to WMKI in 1998.

Crawford Broadcasting bought WMKI in 1999.  Upon assuming control of the station, they changed the station's format to talk radio, and returned the heritage call sign of WYDE to the station.  In 2002, the call signs changed to WDJC, and the station became a Christian teaching and Southern gospel music station.  The current call signs were assumed on July 15, 2004.

As of October 26, 2016, this station is now being heard on Birmingham area Translator W245CS 96.9 FM.  (Info extracted from fccdata.org)

WXJC broadcasts in the HD Radio format.

On November 5, 2018 WXJC switched its FM repeater (and WXJC-FM calls) from 92.5 FM Cordova to 101.1 FM Cullman.

References

External links
FCC History Cards for WXJC
WXJC official website

XJC
XJC
Southern Gospel radio stations in the United States
Talk radio stations in the United States
Radio stations established in 1946
1946 establishments in Alabama